The Fokker 100 is a regional jet produced by Fokker in the Netherlands.

It is powered by two newer Rolls-Royce Tay turbofans, and it has an updated glass cockpit and a wider wing and tail for increased maximum weights.

The program was announced in 1983 and it made its maiden flight on 30 November 1986.
The variant was approved on 20 November 1987, and first deliveries to Swissair started in February 1988.
American Airlines ordered 75, TAM Transportes Aéreos Regionais asked for 50, and USAir got 40.
It is the basis of the shorter Fokker 70, which made its first flight in April 1993.
Fokker had financial troubles and went bankrupt in March 1996, and production ended in 1997 after 283 deliveries.
Amsterdam-based Rekkof group wants to restart its production and update it with new engines, but has not reached its goal.

Since the 2000s, airlines have been retiring the aircraft, but large numbers remain in operation in Australia, with smaller numbers in Iran and various other countries.
In July 2019, 101 aircraft remained in airline service, with 19 airlines around the world.

Design

Maximum weights are increased, while fuel capacity, maximum speed, and ceiling remain the same, and passenger capacity went from 85 to 109.
The flight deck went digital with a flight management system, an autopilot/flight director including CAT III autoland, thrust management system, electronic flight instrument displays, and full ARINC avionics.

The new wing was claimed to be 30% more efficient in cruise, while retaining the simplicity of a fixed leading edge. The cockpit was updated with a Rockwell Collins DU-1000 electronic flight instrument system. The Fokker 100 retained the twin rear fuselage-mounted engines and T-tail configuration of the Fokker Fellowship, like the Douglas DC-9 family. The F100 lacks the auxiliary overhead windows above the cockpit windshields of the F28.

Development

A type certificate was applied for on 25 March 1983. The program was announced in 1983. A pair of prototypes was built. On 30 November 1986, the first prototype, PH-MKH, flew for the first time, while the second, PH-MKC, followed on 25 February 1987.

The variant was approved on 20 November 1987. In February 1988, the first deliveries of the Tay 620-15-powered versions started to Swissair. Major customers included American Airlines with 75 ordered, TAM Transportes Aéreos Regionais with 50, and USAir with 40, their aircraft powered by the more powerful Tay 650-15. The March 1989 American Airlines order, valued at an estimated , was not only the largest single order ever placed at Fokker, but also the largest-ever order from a Netherlands company.

During the early 1990s, Fokker and DASA explored a commercial relationship for regional aircraft. DASA purchased 40% of Fokker in 1993. By 1995, though, both Fokker and DASA were suffering financial difficulties, leading to DASA leaving the regional aircraft market. In June 1996, DASA sold the majority of Dornier to Fairchild Aircraft, leading to the creation of Fairchild Dornier, emerging as the third-largest regional aircraft manufacturer.

Although the Fokker 100 was successful, Fokker accumulated losses for several years, contributing to its collapse in 1996. Fokker 100 production stopped in early 1997.

Potential revival
Discussions regarding the potential for either portions or the entirety of Fokker being purchased by Bombardier Inc. are known to have taken place, but talks ultimately fell through without a deal being reached. Dutch firm Stork B.V. has since acquired the maintenance business for the type and has since been providing services to existing operators, having adopted the name Fokker Aviation. Like any number of regional airliner designs, the Fokker 70/100 was being increasingly squeezed from below by stretched versions of the Bombardier and Embraer regional jets; this intense competitive pressure had also been responsible for killing off plans for the Fairchild Dornier 728 family, along with an unnamed design being considered by ATR. At one point, a proposal was made for a stretched version of the Fokker 100, known as the Fokker 130, however this was never built.

In 1999, an Amsterdam-based group, Rekkof Restart (Rekkof is Fokker spelled backwards), announced it had entered into negotiations with the intention of reopening both the Fokker 70 and 100 lines. During the 2000s, the Netherlands Aircraft Company (otherwise known as NG Aircraft) was formed for the purpose of restarting production, although the ambition has suffered some delays, including some false starts. In March 2010, NG Aircraft stated that it had securing funding from the Ministry of Economic Affairs to adapt an existing Fokker 100 to serve as a prototype for a planned improved new-build series; that same month, the company announced its interest in converting existing aircraft to a proposed new-build equivalent standard, in addition to its primary focus of constructing wholly new Fokker 100s. In March 2011, it was announced that the government of Brazil had formed a partnership for the revival of the Fokker 100.

In July 2014, Maarten Van Eeghen, chief executive of NG Aircraft, revealed more details about the pending revival and the new generation of aircraft that would be produced. Dubbed the F120NG, it would be a new-build aircraft, seating a maximum of 125 to 130 passengers, that would be essentially a stretched model of the base Fokker 100. It would adopt a new powerplant, the Pratt & Whitney PurePower PW1X17G turbofan engine rated at 17,600 lb thrust, which is claimed to result in the new-generation airliner burning 50% less fuel per seat than the original Fokker 100. It was claimed in 2014 that the earliest entry-to-service date for the F120NG would be 2019, based on a five-year development and testing programme after obtaining official clearance to proceed.

Operational history

By 1991, Fokker had produced 70 units and had orders for more than 230. The aircraft joined the American Airlines fleet in August 1991. In 1993, an extended-range version of the Fokker 100, outfitted with additional fuel tanks in the centre fuselage, was introduced; it was followed by a quick-change passenger/freighter version in 1994, designated as the Fokker 100QC. In 1993, a shortened version of the airliner was introduced, designated as the Fokker 70; this aircraft was intended as a replacement for the earlier Fokker F28 and featured the removal of 4.70 m (15.42 ft) of the fuselage and reduced seating to 80. Third-party aircraft companies, such as Phoenix Aero Solutions, have since offered their own conversion programs to produce freighters from former airliner-configuration Fokker 100s. While studies were conducted on a proposed 130-seat Fokker 130, this proposal ultimately did not reach further stages of development.

In 2000, to counter upstart Legend Airlines, American refitted five Fokker 100s in a 56-seat all-business class configuration to circumvent Wright Amendment long-haul flight restrictions from Dallas Love Field. The airline later added a sixth 56-seat Fokker, but after the September 11 attacks, the Love Field service was cancelled and these aircraft were grounded. In late 2002, American Airlines decided to retire its entire 74-aircraft fleet early, citing high operating costs; the jets would be phased out in 2004 and replaced with smaller, but more economical regional jets operated by its American Eagle regional affiliates.

In 2003, a Fokker 100EJ (Executive Jet) variant was introduced; these were remanufactured aircraft produced by Fokker Services as conversions from used Fokker 100 airliners. Priced around $12 million, the Fokker 100EJ seated between 19 and 31 passengers in three different luxury configurations, all of which featured galleys, while two were outfitted with shower-equipped master suites; additional features include an auxiliary fuel system to extend the aircraft's range by roughly 1,600 km. By late 2009, a total of six Fokker 100s were in VIP service, while a further two were used in a 50-seat corporate layout.

The Great Recession in the late 2000s prompted airlines to retire the Fokker 100 in large numbers; some later returned to operations, while a considerable portion were broken up, instead. In March 2009, Mexicana announced that the confirmation of an agreement with Boeing to lease 25 Boeing 717s as a replacement for its fleet of 25 Fokker 100s. In September 2009, one of the last Asian operators of the type, Mandarin Airlines, phased out the last of its Fokker 100s. According to maintenance and servicing company Fokker Services, Fokker 100 airliners constructed during the 1990s had been anticipated to be serviceable until 2035, while the type was expected to remain competitive without modification until at least 2020.

In August 2009, Australian airline Skywest Airlines announced that it would be outfitting its fleet of Fokker 100 and Fokker 70 aircraft with a new satellite navigation system; these had the advantage of enabling shorter approaches at night and in bad weather, saving time and fuel, and increasing safety and schedule reliability, as well as increasing the number of airports usable by the type.

It has replaced the DGA's previous testbed of choice, the Dassault Falcon 20 business jet, and has been outfitted with various systems of the Dassault Rafale fighter aircraft for testing purposes, including the Rafale's nose section, Thales RBE2 active electronically scanned array radar and optronics equipment, and Reco NG targeting pod under the fuselage and a complement of MBDA Mica air-to-air missiles. The first aircraft, which was formerly used by Régional, is to be followed by four more used Fokker 100s.

In June 2015, Austrian Airlines, then one of the larger operators of the Fokker 100, announced its approval of a plan to procure used Embraer 195 regional jets to replace its inventory of Fokker 100 and Fokker 70 jets, which had an average age of 21 years across the fleet. In November 2015, Alliance Airlines announced that it would acquire the entire Austrian Airlines Fokker fleet of fifteen Fokker 100 and six Fokker 70 airliners.

Shortly after the crash of Bek Air Flight 2100 on 27 December 2019, the Government of Kazakhstan indefinitely suspended Fokker 100 operations in Kazakh airspace. On 17 April 2020, citing the airline's failure to correct the safety violations discovered during the investigation, the AAK recalled the company's air operator's certificate and the airworthiness certificates of its remaining Fokker 100 aircraft.

Operators

Current operators

Airlines
As of August 2019, 126 aircraft were still in operational use with airlines. Many of them are used in Australia by Alliance Airlines, Virgin Australia Regional Airlines, and QantasLink in support of the mining industry, with low use rates for an airline, around 1,200 hours per year.

Governments
 French government (1)
 Slovak government (2)

Former operators

Accidents and incidents
 
 
 

 
 
 29 June 2007: An Ivorian government Fokker 100 carrying Prime Minister Guillaume Soro, members of his delegation, and 20 journalists was taxiing on the runway at Bouaké Airport when it was targeted by rocket and Kalashnikov fire. One rocket struck and exploded in the cabin, another one missed, and a third bounced off the fuselage and did not detonate. Soro wasn't injured, but four people were killed and ten others wounded. Those who died were Security Chief Drissa Ouattara, the Prime Minister's bodyguard Siaka Diomandé, and Protocole d’État members Sékou Doumbia and Souleymane Sérifou. Arrests were subsequently reported.

Specifications

See also

References

External links

 
 
 
 

1980s Dutch airliners
100
Twinjets
T-tail aircraft
Aircraft first flown in 1986
Low-wing aircraft